Sir John Rogers, 2nd Baronet (14 June 1676 – 21 January 1744) was an English lawyer and politician who sat in the House of Commons from 1713 to 1722.

Rogers was the only son of Sir John Rogers, 1st Baronet and his wife Mary Vincent, daughter of Spencer Vincent and was baptised at St Andrew's, Plymouth on 14 June 1676. His father was a merchant of Plymouth and had also been Member of Parliament for the town from 1698 to 1700. On 9 May 1698, Rogers married Mary Henley, daughter of Sir Robert Henley at St Giles in the Fields in London after which his father gave him the Blachford Estate at Cornwood, near Ivybridge. In 1710, he succeeded his father to the baronetcy.

Rogers became Recorder of Plymouth in 1713 and was elected as Member of Parliament (MP) for Plymouth at the 1713 general election. He was re-elected MP for Plymouth at the 1715 general election but did not stand in 1722.  Rogers was Mayor of Plymouth in 1722 and again in 1741.

Rogers died on 21 January 1744 aged 67 and was buried in Cornwood in Devon a week later. He and his wife had five sons and five daughters. He was succeeded in the baronetcy successively by his sons Sir John Rogers, 3rd Baronet and Frederick.

References

1676 births
1744 deaths
Baronets in the Baronetage of England
British MPs 1713–1715
British MPs 1715–1722
Members of the Parliament of Great Britain for Plymouth
Mayors of Plymouth